Ramiel (Raʿamʾēl) is a fallen Watcher (angel) not to be confused with the holy angel "Remiel” who is an Archangel in the apocryphal Book of Enoch. Ramiel [Watcher] mentioned in [Chapter 7], is one of the 20 Watchers (angels) that sinned and rebelled against God by mating with a human woman and creating an offspring called Nephilim. 
Remiel [Archangel] is mentioned later on in [Chapter 20], as one of the seven holy angels who watch; the angel whom God set over those who rise. Remiel is also known as Jeremiel in certain translations of 2 Esdras.

The name Ra'amel means "God has thundered" from the Hebrew elements ra'am and El, "God".

Watcher 
There are 20 leaders in the Book of Enoch, also called 1 Enoch. The section that mentions them reads:

 

As described in 1 Enoch, these are the leaders of 200 angels that are turned into fallen Angels due to their taking wives, mating with human women, and teaching forbidden knowledge. One of 20 leaders, Ramiel is mentioned sixth.

Archangel 

Remiel, also known as Jeremiel (Hebrew: יְרַחְמְאֵל Yəraḥməʾēl, Tiberian: Yăraḥmē̆ʾēl, "God shall have mercy"; Greek: Ρεμειήλ) is mentioned in 2 Baruch where he presides over true visions (55:3) and is listed as one of the seven Holy Angels in 1 Enoch 20:8. In this chapter, He is described as "one of the holy angels, whom God set over those who rise".
 
Remiel is the archangel of hope, and he is credited with two tasks: he is responsible for divine visions, and he guides the souls of the faithful into Heaven. He is called Jeremiel or Uriel in various translations of IV Esdras.

See also
List of angels in theology
2 Baruch
Azazel
Remiel (DC Comics)
Remiel (Tales of Symphonia)

References

 The Book Of Enoch (1917) translated by R. H. Charles, introduction by W. O. E. Oesterley 
 The Ethiopic Book Of Enoch (1978), Knibb, Michael A., Oxford: Clarendon Press, repr. 1982.

Watchers (angels)
Archangels
Ge'ez language